Juliane Fredrikke "Julli" Wiborg (née Landmark; 11 March 1880 – 25 August 1947) was a Norwegian teacher and author. She published 34 books, mainly children's books and young girls' novels. Cappelen was her publisher.

Family and background 
Juliane Landmark was born in 1880 in Ytre Holmedal, Norway. Her father Nils Landmark (1844–1923) was the grandson of judge Nils Landmark, and worked as a skipper on the Norwegian Missionary Society's mission ship Elieser from 1872 to 1880, later working for the Norwegian customs agency. Her mother, Elise Schram, was a teacher. She had two sisters, Edle Solberg and Eva Marie Holthe.

She graduated from the teachers' school in Notodden in 1903, and worked as a teacher in Porsgrunn and Fet from 1903 until 1907. In 1907 she married fellow teacher Nils Olaf Wiborg, and they moved to Kristiania (now Oslo) in 1909. Together they had three children, Elisabeth, Ingrid and Randi. Wiborg died 25 August 1947 in Oslo.

Literary work 

Many of Wiborg's book are termed young girls' books, and several of her books were very popular, being published in three to seven editions.

In 1908 she published her first book, . Her true breakthrough came with the Kiss series and Ragna books.

Breaking free from family or societal expectations of who one should be is a consistent theme in several of Wiborg's books. While she was free-minded and questions established truths, her books also come from a moral/Christian basis and her characters always end up making the "right" choices.

In Wiborg's books, society is portrayed almost realistically – the girls who work hard to be independent are also students who have to work as domestic help on the side to make ends meet, and the reader sees businesses go bankrupt and travelers to America return disillusioned. Snobbery and class distinction are condemned, while hard work and honest motives are emphasized as good qualities.

When her books were first released, they received both hard criticism and glowing reviews. Critics felt that she wrote romantic books without any literary quality, that she had a very traditional view of women, or that her books were superficial and her use of language was poor. Other newspapers praised her books for their relevance, for quality of entertainment, or for a good moral message.

Selected works 

  (1908)
  (1909) – published by Lutherstiftelsen forlag
  (1910)
  (1911)
  (1911)
  (1913)
  (1914)
  (1915)
  (1916)
  (1917)
  (1918)
  (1919)
  (1920)
  (1920)
  (1921)
  (1922)
  (1922)
  (1924)
  (1925)
  (1927)
  (1928)
  (1929)
  (1930)
  (1931)
  (1932)
  (1933)
  (1934)
 (1935) – cover illustrated by Harald Damsleth
  (1937) – cover illustrated by Harald Damsleth
  (1938) – cover illustrated by Harald Damsleth
  (1939)

Translations 
A number of her books were translated into Swedish. In Sweden as well, her books received tough criticism:

Swedish bibliography 

  (1913)
  (1914) – translated by Louise af Klercker
  (1916)
  (1917)
  (1922) – translated by Thea Hökerberg
  (1923) – translated by Thea Hökerberg
  (1924) – translated by Thea Hökerberg
  (1925)
  (1926)
  (1927)
  (1930)
  (1933)
  (1936)
  (1937) – translated by Dora Graaf
  (1938) – translated by Ragnhild Hallén, new edition 1956
  (1938)
  (1941)
  (1947)

Danish bibliography 

  (1932) – translated by Esther Malling, published by Jespersen og Pios forlag
  (1939) – published by Jespersen og Pios forlag

Finnish bibliography 

  (1928)

German bibliography 
Several of Wiborg's books were also translated to German and published by Deutchnordischer Verlag.

  (1921)
  (1921)
  (1921)

References

Further reading

External links 

1880 births
1947 deaths
Norwegian women children's writers
19th-century Norwegian women writers
Norwegian women novelists
People from Vestfold og Telemark